Edwin Flavell may refer to:

 Edwin Flavell (British Army officer) (1898–1993)
 Edwin Flavell (Royal Air Force officer) (1922–2014)